Albert Poisson (1868–1893), was a Romantic author, particularly interested in alchemy. In 1891, at the age of 22, he published what would become his most famous book: Théories et symboles des alchimistes (The theories and symbols of alchemy), which saw several editions.  He died in 1893, aged 24.

Works
 Théories et symboles des alchimistes Chacornac, 1891. 
 L'initiation alchimique (13 lettres inédites sur la pratique du Grand Œuvre), Paris, Édition de l'Initiation, 1900.
 Nicolas Flamel, Histoire de l'Alchimie, Paris, Gutenberg reprint, 1981.
 Le livre des feux, paru dans la Revue Scientifique, n° 15, avril 1891.
 Cinq traités d'alchimie des plus grands philosophes: Paracelse, Albert le Grand, Roger Bacon, R. Lulle, Arn. de Villeneuve, bibliothèque Chacornac, 1890.

1868 births
1893 deaths
French alchemists
19th-century alchemists